The German National Movement in Liechtenstein (VDBL) was a Nazi party in Liechtenstein that existed between 1938 and 1945.

Formation and ideology
The VDBL formed after the Anschluss of Austria in 1938, advocating for the integration of Liechtenstein into the Greater German Reich.

The organization disseminated its ideology through its newspaper, Der Umbruch.

A slogan associated with the party was Liechtenstein den Liechtensteinern! (Liechtenstein for the Liechtensteiners!). This implied a radical populism that would threaten the allegiance of the people of Liechtenstein to ruling Prince Franz Josef II.

Coup attempt and party demise
In March 1939, the VDBL staged an amateurish coup attempt, first trying to provoke a German intervention by burning swastikas, followed by declaring an Anschluß with Germany. The leaders were almost immediately arrested and the hoped-for German invasion failed to materialise.

The inability of the party to participate in the 1939 elections (after a pact between the main parties to keep the election date a secret), combined with the drastic decrease in Nazi sympathies following the outbreak of World War II led to a temporary demise of the party. However, in June 1940 it was reconstituted under the leadership of Dr. Alfons Goop. During 1941 and 1942, the party was involved in vehement anti-Semitic agitation, urging a solution to the country's presumed "Jewish Question," accusing Jewish families in Liechtenstein of spying for the Allies. By early 1943, the VDBL had become an embarrassment to Germany. Its recruitment for the Waffen-SS compromised Liechtenstein's neutrality, infuriating the Swiss government. The German Ministry of Foreign Affairs in March 1943 forced the VDBL to hold talks with the Patriotic Union (VU), in Friedrichshafen under auspices of the Waffen-SS, in order to reach a fusion of both parties, which shared an anti-Bolshevik and anti-clerical programme. Severely disappointed, Goop resigned as party leader. In the end the VU only consented to some "cultural cooperation." When Germany's war fortunes declined, in July 1943 Der Umbruch was forbidden by the authorities. In 1946, party leaders were prosecuted for the 1939 coup attempt. In 1947, Goop was condemned for high treason and sentenced to a thirty-month imprisonment.

References

Defunct political parties in Liechtenstein
History of Liechtenstein
Nazi parties
Political parties established in 1938
Political parties disestablished in 1945
1938 establishments in Liechtenstein
German nationalist political parties
1945 disestablishments in Liechtenstein
Anti-communist parties
Collaboration with Nazi Germany‎